NH, formerly known as RTV NH (Radio & Televisie Noord-Holland), is a public broadcasting station that focuses on news from the Dutch province of North Holland. NH is the official regional broadcaster in the event of a disaster. Its headquarters is located in Hilversum.

External links

Radio stations in the Netherlands
Television channels in the Netherlands
Television channels and stations established in 1989
Mass media in North Holland
Dutch companies established in 1989